Failsworth is a town in the Metropolitan Borough of Oldham, Greater Manchester, England.

Failsworth may also refer to:
 Failsworth tram stop, formerly railway station
 Failsworth School
 Failsworth stadium, a cancelled football stadium for Oldham Athletic A.F.C.